Landing pad may refer to:

 Helipad, a landing area for helicopters
 Rocket landing pad (disambiguation)

See also
 Landing zone (disambiguation)
 Landing (disambiguation)